XHWZ-FM is a radio station on 90.9 FM in San Luis Potosí, San Luis Potosí. It is owned by MG Radio and carries the La Mejor grupera format from MVS Radio.

History
XEWZ-AM 820 received its concession on May 8, 1979. It was owned by Sergio Ramírez Hernández and broadcast from Cerritos with 1 kW as a daytimer. It moved to Soledad Diez Gutiérrez and 620 kHz in the 1990s, broadcasting with 2.5 kW in the day and 500 watts at night and reaching a much wider audience.

On June 7, 2012, XHWZ-FM 90.9 came to air. In September 2013, it flipped from its longtime format of Radio Novedades to become adult contemporary MÁS FM, operated by MG Radio. It flipped to La Mejor on December 3, 2016, as a result of MG's alignment with MVS. La Mejor had previously been in the market on XHPM-FM 100.1 between 2007 and 2009.

References

Radio stations in San Luis Potosí